Ioditis is a genus of moths belonging to the subfamily Tortricinae of the family Tortricidae.

Species
Ioditis capnobactra Meyrick, 1938
Ioditis mokwae Razowski, 2013

See also
List of Tortricidae genera

References

External links
tortricidae.com

Tortricinae
Tortricidae genera
Taxa named by Edward Meyrick